The Vancouver Canucks are a Canadian professional ice hockey team based in Vancouver, British Columbia. They are members of the Pacific Division of the Western Conference in the National Hockey League (NHL). The Canucks joined the league in 1970–71 season as an expansion team, along with the Buffalo Sabres.

In their history, the team has captured the Clarence S. Campbell Bowl as Western Conference champions in 1982, 1994 and 2011, but lost in their three Stanley Cup appearances to the New York Islanders, New York Rangers and Boston Bruins, respectively.  The Sedin twins have won a combined four awards. Markus Naslund has played in five NHL All-Star Games, the most in Canucks history.

Six players have had their numbers retired by the Canucks organization. Stan Smyl became the first Canuck to have his #12 retired in 1991, followed by Trevor Linden's #16 in 2008, Markus Naslund's #19 in 2010, Pavel Bure's #10 in 2013, Henrik Sedin's #33, and Daniel Sedin's #22 in 2020. Although they have been recognized for their accomplishments with different teams, Igor Larionov, Cam Neely, Mark Messier, Mats Sundin and Pavel Bure are several Hockey Hall of Famers who have played for the Canucks during their careers; former owner Frank Griffiths, coach Roger Neilson and general managers Bud Poile, Jake Milford and Pat Quinn have been inducted as builders. Twin brothers Henrik Sedin and Daniel Sedin, who played in Vancouver for their entire careers, as well as goaltender Roberto Luongo who was an integral part of the team for nearly a decade, were all inducted into the Hockey Hall of Fame as part of the class of 2022.

The Canucks have seven internal team awards – the Molson Cup is awarded to the player who earns the most three-star selections throughout the season; the Cyclone Taylor Trophy is given to the team's most valuable player; Cyrus H. McLean Trophy recognizes the Canucks' leading scorer; the Walter "Babe" Pratt Trophy is given to the best Canucks defenceman; the Fred J. Hume Award is awarded to the Canucks' unsung hero, the Pavel Bure Most Exciting Player Award is awarded to the player judged to be the most exciting on the team, and the Daniel & Henrik Sedin Award is awarded to the player who has best demonstrated community leadership. Each of these awards are presented towards the end of the season.

League awards

Team trophies
The Canucks have won the Western (previously the Campbell) Conference three times, in the 1982, 1994 and 2011 seasons.

Individual awards
In their first 21 years, Vancouver Canucks players and staff were not able to win a major individual NHL award until the 1991–92 NHL season.  In that year, Pavel Bure won the Calder Memorial Trophy as the league's rookie of the year and Pat Quinn won the Jack Adams Award as coach of the year. Since the 1991–92 season, Canucks players and staff have won an additional 14 individual NHL awards, winning the most awards in the 2010–11 season, with five. The two most decorated Canucks players are Daniel and Henrik Sedin. The Sedins have won a combined five awards, including the Ted Lindsay Award, the Hart Memorial Trophy and becoming the first brother duo to win back-to-back Art Ross Trophies.

All-Stars

NHL first and second team All-Stars
The NHL first and second team All-Stars are the top players at each position as voted on by the Professional Hockey Writers' Association.

NHL All-Rookie Team
The NHL All-Rookie Team consists of the top rookies at each position as voted on by the Professional Hockey Writers' Association.

All-Star Game selections
The National Hockey League All-Star Game is a mid-season exhibition game held annually between many of the top players of each season. Forty-one All-Star Games have been held since the Canucks' inaugural season. The All-Star Game has not been held in various years: 1995, 2005 and 2013 as a result of labour stoppages; 2021 as a result of the COVID-19 pandemic; 2006, 2010 and 2014 because of the Winter Olympics; 1979 and 1987 due to the 1979 Challenge Cup; and the Rendez-vous '87 series between the NHL and the Soviet national team. The NHL also held a Young Stars Game for first- and second-year players from 2002 to 2009.

The Canucks hosted the 1977 All-Star Game at the Pacific Coliseum and the 1998 NHL All-Star Game at General Motors Place. In 1977, Harold Snepsts was the lone Canucks representative as the Wales Conference defeated the Campbell Conference 4–3 in front of 15,607 in attendance. In 1998, both Mark Messier and Pavel Bure were the two Canucks representatives at the All-Star Game, with Messier playing for the North America All-Stars and Bure with the World All-Stars. Team North America won the game 8–7 in front of a sold-out crowd of 18,422. Currently, Markus Naslund played a franchise-high five All-Star Games as a member of the Canucks and Brock Boeser is the only Canuck to ever be named NHL All-Star MVP (2018).

 Selected by fan vote
 Selected as one of four "last men in" by fan vote
 All-Star Game Most Valuable Player

Career achievements

Hockey Hall of Fame
Before entering the NHL, the Vancouver Canucks of the WHL and PCHL had six notable players and one builder that was inducted to the Hockey Hall of Fame. The list of Hall of Famers included Andy Bathgate, Johnny Bower, Tony Esposito, Allan Stanley, Gump Worsley and former owner Fred J. Hume, who was inducted under the Builders category. Bill Cowley was also inducted as a player, although his only affiliation with the Canucks was general manager and head coach in 1948–49.

Since entering the NHL in 1970, several members of the Vancouver Canucks organization have been honoured by the Hockey Hall of Fame. Cam Neely was the first Canucks player inducted, gaining election in 2005, although the majority of Neely's career and success was spent with the Boston Bruins. Within the next three years, Mark Messier would also be inducted into the Hall of Fame in 2007, along with Igor Larionov in 2008 and Mats Sundin in 2012, though their career accomplishments were well-known on other teams.

Until the induction in 2022 of Henrik Sedin and Daniel Sedin (along with Roberto Luongo, who played much of his career in Vancouver), Pavel Bure was the only Hall of Famer to spend the majority of his playing career with the Canucks. Known for his skating ability, the "Russian Rocket" spent seven seasons in Vancouver, accumulating 478 points (254 goals and 224 assists) in 428 games, winning the Calder Memorial Trophy as rookie of the year in 1992, being named an NHL First All-Star in 1994 and participated in four NHL All-Star Games. He is also the current club record holder for most goals in a season (60;  (both 1992–93 and 1993–94) and club holder of most shorthanded goals (24). However, Bure will always be best remembered for his play during the 1994 Stanley Cup playoffs when he led the Canucks with 16 goals and 31 points, helping the team reach the Finals only to lose the Stanley Cup to the New York Rangers in seven games.

Five members of team management have been inducted in the "Builders" category. Two former general managers, Bud Poile and Jake Milford, were the first two members inducted into the Hall of Fame. Poile was the Canucks' first general manager in 1970 and was inducted in 1990, while Milford became general manager from 1977 to 1982, building the team that went to the Stanley Cup Finals in 1982. Milford served as the club's senior vice-president until his sudden death on December 24, 1984, which occurred one month after his induction.

Long-time owner Frank Griffiths would be the third Canucks builder to be inducted in 1993. Griffiths was the majority owner of the Canucks from 1974 until his death in 1994.  In 2002, Former head coach Roger Neilson became the fourth Canucks builder to be inducted into the Hall of Fame. Neilson started as an assistant coach, but eventually took over the coaching duties in March 1982 after coach Harry Neale was suspended for taking part in an altercation with fans during a brawl in Quebec. In that same year, Neilson led the Canucks to the Finals and in Game 2 of the Campbell Conference Finals against the Chicago Blackhawks; he felt his team was unfairly penalized on several occasions during the third period and took a trainer's white towel and held it on a hockey stick, as if to say, "I give up." Three other Canuck players did the same thing, and all were ejected from the game. By doing so, Neilson inadvertently started a Canucks playoff tradition known as "Towel Power."

The third general manager and fifth builder to be inducted into the Hall of Fame was Pat Quinn who served as Canucks' general manager for ten years with four of those years as head coach.  Quinn, was known for building the Canucks to respectability during the early nineties as the team finished with back-to-back division titles in 1992 and 1993, and were one win away from winning the Stanley Cup in 1994.  That success was due in part with the trades that Pat Quinn started in 1987 when his first move was obtaining a young goaltender, Kirk McLean and left winger, Greg Adams from the New Jersey Devils and picking two notable drafts with future captain, Trevor Linden in 1988  and future superstar, Pavel Bure in 1989.  He later strengthened the team by making trades to acquire Geoff Courtnall, Cliff Ronning, Sergio Momesso and Robert Dirk from the St. Louis Blues in 1991, which paved the way for the team's success.  His other most notable trade came in the 1996 season when he traded Alek Stojanov to the Pittsburgh Penguins in exchange for Markus Naslund, which is seen as one of the NHL's most lopsided trades as Naslund became a superstar player in the NHL during the 2000s and was part of the famed "West Coast Express" line with Todd Bertuzzi and Brendan Morrison.

Foster Hewitt Memorial Award
Two former regional broadcasters for the Vancouver Canucks have been honoured with the Foster Hewitt Memorial Award. Former Canucks radio and television broadcaster Jim Robson was named the recipient of the award in 1992 mostly for his years of service on the team's broadcasts. Robson was the radio voice of the Canucks from 1970 to 1994 and continued to work their television broadcasts until 1999. Robson also did additional work with CBC Television's Hockey Night in Canada, calling three All-Star Games, parts of four Stanley Cup Finals and is probably best remembered for his call of Bob Nystrom's Stanley Cup-winning overtime goal for the New York Islanders in 1980. The other, also a former Canucks radio and television broadcaster, Jim Hughson, was a recipient of the award in 2019 for his work on regional Canucks broadcasts, as well as nationally on Hockey Night in Canada.

Retired numbers

The Vancouver Canucks have retired six numbers. The Canucks retired #12 in honour of Stan Smyl who played right wing for the Canucks from 1978 to 1991 and is tied for the most years served as captain with 8. Trevor Linden's #16 was retired in 2008, and was recognized as "Captain Canuck" during his 17 years with the Canucks from 1988–98 and 2001–08. Markus Naslund's #19 was retired in 2010, and was the first Canuck to win the Lester B. Pearson Award for Most Outstanding Player as voted by the players. Hockey Hall of Famer Pavel Bure's #10 was retired in 2013, and is the current single-season club record holder for most goals in a season (60; both 1992–93 and 1993–94) and current club holder of most short handed goals (24). Most recently, Daniel and Henrik Sedin's #22 and #33 were retired in 2020. Henrik is the Canucks all-time regular season leader in game played (1330), assists (830) and points (1070), while Daniel is 2nd in all the aforementioned stats and holds the Canucks regular season records for goals (393), power play goals (138) and overtime goals (16). 

Also out of circulation is the number 99 which was retired league-wide for Wayne Gretzky on February 6, 2000. Gretzky did not play for the Canucks during his 20-year NHL career and no Canucks player had ever worn the number 99 prior to its retirement.

Taken out of circulation
The Vancouver Canucks have also unofficially retired three numbers within their organization as remembrance to players whose playing careers were cut short tragically while a member of the franchise. 

Wayne Maki played left wing for the Canucks from 1970–73, and was one of the team's leading scorers in the franchises first two seasons. He was diagnosed with brain cancer in December 1972 and died at the age of 29 in 1974.  Since then, Mark Messier has been the only Canuck to wear #11 in his brief stint with the Canucks.

Luc Bourdon died in a motorcycle accident on May 29, 2008, near his hometown of Shippagan, New Brunswick. At the 2008–09 season opener, the Canucks honoured Bourdon with a pre-game ceremony and his last game-worn jersey was presented to his family by the fan who won the jersey during an annual charity event the previous season. Afterwards, Tom Cochrane and Red Rider performed "Big League" during the video tribute. The Canucks also wore "LB" on their helmets that season in memory of Bourdon and the Luc Bourdon Wall of Dreams was established to commemorate Bourdon at General Motors Place.

Rick Rypien was found dead in his home in Crowsnest Pass, Alberta, on August 15, 2011, and the cause of death was later confirmed as suicide. Although he joined the Winnipeg Jets in the offseason as an unrestricted free agent, the Canucks honored Rypien's memory early in the 2011–12 season with a video entitled "Heart of a Canuck" and an homage to Rypien was worn on the back of all Canucks helmets for the entirety of the 2011–12 season.

Ring of Honour
At the start of their 40th season, the Vancouver Canucks decided to launch the Ring of Honour to celebrate and salute Canuck heroes who have made a lasting impact on the franchise.

Team awards

Walter "Babe" Pratt Trophy
Main: Walter "Babe" Pratt Trophy

The Walter "Babe" Pratt Trophy is given to the best Canucks defenceman, as voted by the fans. The trophy is presented at the last home game of the regular season. It was first awarded for the 1972–73 season as the Premier's Trophy, but as of the 1989–90 season, after the untimely death of Hockey Hall of Fame defenceman and Canucks goodwill ambassador Babe Pratt, the trophy was renamed in honour of him. Mattias Ohlund, Jyrki Lumme, Doug Lidster and Harold Snepsts have won the award four times.

Cyclone Taylor Trophy
 Main: Cyclone Taylor Trophy
The Cyclone Taylor Trophy is the award given each year to the most valuable player on the Vancouver Canucks as voted by the fans. It is named after Cyclone Taylor, a Canadian professional ice hockey forward who led the Vancouver Millionaires to the Stanley Cup in 1915. The award was dedicated to him prior to the 1979–80 Canucks season, the season after his death on June 9, 1979, although an award for the Canucks MVP has existed since the team's inauguration in 1970. Markus Naslund has won the award five times.

Cyrus H. McLean Trophy
Main: Cyrus H. McLean Trophy

The Cyrus H. McLean Trophy was named after Cyrus H. McLean who was the former team president of the WHL Vancouver Canucks from 1968–70. The trophy was first awarded in the Canucks first season, which recognizes the Canucks leading scorer over the course of the regular season. Markus Naslund has won the award the most times, leading the Canucks in scoring seven consecutive years, from 1999 to 2006.

Fred J. Hume Award
Main: Fred J. Hume Award

The Fred J. Hume Award is named after Fred J. Hume, who was the former mayor of Vancouver and owner of the Canucks while they were in the Western Hockey League. The team award is given out at the end of each NHL season to the team's unsung hero, as voted by the fans. Before the 2016-2017 season, the winner was decided by the Vancouver Canucks Booster Club since the inaugural 1970–71 season. Jannik Hansen has won this award 3 times, the most in team history. In 2018, Dorsett won the award in the same season he announced his retirement from the NHL due to health reasons and risks.

Three Stars Award
 Main: Molson Cup
The Canucks are one of several teams in Canada that award the Molson Cup to the player who is named one of a game's top three players, or "three stars", most often over the course of the regular season. Roberto Luongo has won the Molson Cup five times, the most in team history. In recent years, the Molson name has been phased out and the award has been simply named the "Three Stars Award."

Pavel Bure Most Exciting Player Award
Main: Pavel Bure Most Exciting Player Award

The Pavel Bure Most Exciting Player Award is given to the player judged to be the most exciting, as voted by the fans. Prior to the 2013-14 NHL season, the award was simply known as the Most Exciting Player Award. Tony Tanti and Pavel Bure have won the award five times, tied for the most in team history.

Daniel & Henrik Sedin Award
Main: Daniel & Henrik Sedin Award
The Daniel & Henrik Sedin Award was introduced for the 2019-20 season, in honour of the jersey retirements of the Sedins. Each season it is given to one player who best exemplifies outstanding community leadership qualities and humanitarian contributions to his community. The award is selected by a panel of Canucks Sports & Entertainment members.

Defunct team awards

President's Trophy
From 1974–75 to 1995–96, the President's Trophy was awarded to the Canucks' most valuable player. It was originally presented by CP Air and later Canadian Airlines and the player won a pair of airline tickets with the trophy. Obviously, many of the names match the Cyclone Taylor Trophy (also awarded to the MVP) and the trophy was retired after the 1996 season.

Ram Tough Award
The Ram Tough Award was a short-lived award given to the most aggressive player of the Canucks, which was chosen by Canucks management.  It was instituted by Pat Quinn at the start of his general manager duties in 1988–89. The winner of the award received a Dodge Ram truck until 1993–94 when the award was no longer in use.

Other awards

Notes

References

V
 
award winners